All the Little Lights is the fourth studio album by English singer-songwriter Passenger and was released by Black Crow Records and Nettwerk on 24 February 2012. The album contains 12 tracks, comprising 11 studio tracks recorded at Sydney's Linear Recording, and one song recorded live at The Borderline in London. A limited edition features a second disc containing acoustic versions of eight songs from the album.

Track listing

Personnel 
Adapted credits from the media notes of All the Little Lights.
Passenger
 Mike Rosenberg – lead vocals, acoustic guitar, omnichord (tracks 1, 3, 5)

Additional musicians
 Stu Larsen – backing vocals
 Georgia Mooney – backing vocals
 Stuart Hunter – piano, keys, synths
 Cameron Undy – upright bass, electric bass
 Kerry Martin (violin), Madeleine Boud (violin), Shelley Soerensen (viola), Janine Boubbov (cello) – strings (tracks 1, 2, 3, 6)
 James Steendam – string arrangement (tracks 1, 2, 3, 6)
 Glenn Wilson – drums (tracks 1, 2, 3, 9, 10)
 Declan Kelley – drums (track 5)
 Tim Hart – drums (tracks 4, 7, 8), banjo (tracks 3, 6, 9), mandolin (track 6)
 Jess Ciampa – percussion (tracks 3, 6, 8, 11)
 Lucian McGuiness, Simon Ferenci, Sam Golding – brass (tracks 3, 7, 9, 10, 11)
 Alan Davey – trumpet (track 5)

Charts

Weekly charts

Year-end charts

Decade-end charts

Certifications

References 

2012 albums
Passenger (singer) albums